Caulerpa verticillata is a species of seaweed in the Caulerpaceae family.

The seaweed has a green thallus that spreads outward to around  forming dense low mats.

The species is found in warmer waters of the Indian and Pacific Oceans particularly in the Caribbean. In Western Australia, it is found along the coast in the Kimberley region extending south to the Pilbara.

References

verticillata
Species described in 1847